Bhushan Pradyumna Dharmadhikari (born 28 April 1958) is an Indian Judge. He is former Chief Justice of Bombay High Court. He has also served as Acting Chief Justice of Bombay High Court and Judge of Bombay High Court also.

Career
He practised law in Nagpur after enrolment in Bar Council of Maharashtra on 17 October 1980. He became standing counsel for many Government Corporations.
He was elevated as Additional Judge of Bombay High Court on 15 March 2004. After this he was elevated as Permanent Judge on 12 March 2006.

On 24 February 2020, He was appointed Acting Chief Justice of Bombay High Court after the retirement of Chief Justice of the High court Pradeep Nandrajog.

On 24 February 2020, he was  appointed Acting Chief Justice of   Bombay High Court. He was appointed Chief Justice of Bombay High Court on 20 March 2020. He retired on 27 April 2020.

References

Indian judges
1958 births
Living people
Judges of the Bombay High Court
Chief Justices of the Bombay High Court
People from Nagpur